Donald Fleming may refer to:

 Donald Fleming (1905–1986), Canadian parliamentarian
 Donald Fleming (chemist) (born 1938), Canadian chemist
 Donald Fleming (historian) (1923–2008), American historian